Hilgenreiner's line is a horizontal line drawn on an AP radiograph of the pelvis running between the inferior aspects of both triradiate cartilages of the acetabulums.  It is named for Heinrich Hilgenreiner.

Clinical Use

Used in conjunction with Perkin's line or the acetabular angle, Hilgenreiner's line is useful in the diagnosis of developmental dysplasia of the hip.

References

Musculoskeletal radiographic signs